A Matter of Wife... and Death is a 1975 American made-for-television crime drama mystery film. It is a sequel to the 1973 film Shamus and was intended as a pilot for a series. The teleplay was written by Don Ingalls and the film directed by Marvin Chomsky, with former head of production at MGM Robert M. Weitman as the producer. The film was broadcast on NBC on May 3, 1975.

Rod Taylor played the part of the private detective Shamus McCoy, a role originated by Burt Reynolds. The cast also included Anne Archer, Cesare Danova, John Colicos, Luke Askew, Larry Block, Anita Gillette, and Joe Santos reprising his Shamus role of Lieutenant Promuto. Wonder Woman actress Lynda Carter also played a small role as Shamus's girlfriend.

The film ran for 73 minutes in color with mono sound, and was released by Columbia.

References

External links

Shamus McCoy at ThrillingDetective.com

1975 television films
1975 films
1970s mystery films
Films directed by Marvin J. Chomsky
1975 crime drama films
NBC network original films
Television pilots not picked up as a series
American mystery films
American crime drama films
Television sequel films
American sequel films
American drama television films
1970s English-language films
1970s American films